
Year 618 (DCXVIII) was a common year starting on Sunday (link will display the full calendar) of the Julian calendar. The denomination 618 for this year has been used since the early medieval period, when the Anno Domini calendar era became the prevalent method in Europe for naming years.

Events 
 By place 
 Byzantine Empire 
 Byzantine–Sassanian War: A Persian expeditionary force under Shahrbaraz invades Egypt, and occupies the province. After defeating the Byzantine garrisons in the Nile Valley, the Persians march across the Libyan Desert as far as Cyrene.
 The Persians besiege Alexandria; the defence of the city is led by Nicetas (cousin of emperor Heraclius). The Byzantine resistance is undermined by a blockade of the harbor; the usual grain supplies are cut off from Egypt to Constantinople.

 Asia 
 June 18 – The Sui Dynasty ends: Rebel leader Li Yuan captures Luoyang, and has Emperor Yángdi murdered. He proclaims himself emperor Gao Zu and establishes the Tang Dynasty, one of the most notable dynasties in Chinese history, which will last for almost 300 years.
 October 6 – Battle of Yanshi: Wang Shichong decisively defeats Li Mi, during the transition  from Sui to Tang civil war.
 November 29 – Battle of Qianshuiyuan: The Tang dynasty scores a decisive victory over their rival Xue Rengao.
 Tong Yabghu Qaghan becomes the new ruler (khagan) of the Western Turkic Khaganate, founding the Khazar Khaganate. He maintains close relations with the Tang dynasty, and possibly marries into the imperial family.
 Songtsän Gampo becomes the first emperor of the Tibetan Empire, after his father Namri Songtsen is poisoned. During his reign he expands Tibet's power beyond Lhasa (Tibetan Plateau) and the Yarlung Valley.
 Yeongnyu becomes ruler of the Korean kingdom of Goguryeo.

By topic

Religion 
 November 8 – Pope Adeodatus I dies in Rome after a 3-year reign, in which he has reversed the policies of his predecessors, Boniface IV and Gregory I, who favored monks over the secular clergy. Adeodatus will not be replaced until next year.

Births 
 Li Tai, prince of the Tang dynasty (d. 652)

Deaths 
 April 11 – Emperor Yang of Sui, emperor of the Sui Dynasty (b. 569)
 September 3 – Xue Ju, emperor of Qin
 November 8 – Pope Adeodatus I
 December 14 – Xue Rengao, emperor of Qin
 Dou Wei, chancellor of the Tang dynasty
 Fíngen mac Áedo Duib, king of Munster (Ireland)
 Kevin of Glendalough, Irish abbot (b. 498)
 Namri Songtsen, king of Tibet (approximate date)
 Sheguy, ruler of the Western Turkic Khaganate
 Yang Gao, prince of the Sui dynasty (b. 607)
 Yang Hao, prince of the Sui dynasty (b. 586)
 Yang Jian, prince of the Sui dynasty (b. 585)
 Yang Xiu, prince of the Sui dynasty
 Yeongyang, king of Goguryeo (Korea)
 Yu Shiji, official of the Chen- and Sui dynasty

References

Sources